Elizabeth "Bess" Adams McCord is a fictional character and the protagonist of the CBS TV series Madam Secretary portrayed by Téa Leoni. 

In the show, McCord was serving as the United States Secretary of State for the vast majority of episodes, hence the title Madam Secretary; the fictional character was ultimately portrayed as the first female president of the United States in the final season.

Biography
Born in Virginia, Elizabeth attended Houghton Hall Boarding School, where she was co-captain of the debate team alongside Bahrainian Crown Prince Yousif Obaid (Aasif Mandvi).  She attended the University of Virginia, studying mathematics, and one of her professors was future Chief Justice of the United States Frawley (Morgan Freeman).  It was also where she met her future husband. Immediately prior to becoming the Secretary of State, Elizabeth holds a professorship at the University of Virginia and is depicted as holding a doctorate; this is not mentioned in future episodes.

In 1990, Elizabeth married Henry McCord (Tim Daly). They have two daughters, Stephanie "Stevie" (Wallis Currie-Wood) and Alison (Kathrine Herzer), and a son, Jason (Evan Roe). She also has a brother, Dr. Will Adams (Eric Stoltz), who is married to Sophie Adams, and with whom he has a 5-year-old daughter, Annie; both of her parents died when she was young, in a car accident. She speaks fluent French, German, Arabic, Persian, and "a year of high school Spanish".

Career
Elizabeth worked for the CIA as an analyst for 20 years until she resigned from her position due to an ethical dilemma, just as she was being considered for promotion to Station Chief, Baghdad. She then taught at the University of Virginia as a Political Science Professor. After the death of Vincent Marsh (Brian Stokes Mitchell) in a plane crash, President Conrad Dalton (Keith Carradine) (her former mentor at the CIA) asked her to serve as secretary of state. Not a natural politician, Elizabeth frequently clashes with White House Chief of Staff Russell Jackson (Željko Ivanek).

As secretary of state, her first year in office was spent investigating her predecessor's death.

In "Tamerlane", Elizabeth is in the home of Iranian Foreign Minister Zahed Javani (Usman Ally) when a coup d'état orchestrated by Secretary of State Marsh, CIA Director Andrew Munsey, and CIA analyst Juliet Humphrey, is attempted; during the attack, both Minister Javani and her personal bodyguard, DS Agent Fred Cole, were killed. In the aftermath, Elizabeth was left with some post-traumatic stress and has been seeing Russell Jackson's personal therapist.

In "The Show Must Go On", during a communications blackout on Air Force One with both the president and the speaker of the House on board, and with the vice president in surgery and president pro tempore of the Senate found to be incompetent after a series of mini-strokes earlier in the year, Elizabeth is sworn in as acting president for a number of hours.

In "You Say You Want a Revolution", Elizabeth and her Cuban counterpart are instrumental in the restoration of Cuba–United States relations, including the opening of the Cuban embassy in Washington and the U.S. embassy in Havana and the repeal of the embargo against Cuba. This has been viewed as a significant milestone in the Dalton presidency.

During the first half of the second season, McCord was instrumental in preventing a potential United States-Russia War (which ultimately was believed to escalate into World War III).

In "Vartius", due to the failing health and impending resignation of Vice President Mark Delgado (Alex Fernandez), President Dalton offered the vice presidency to McCord. She initially accepted, but when President Dalton lost his party's primary, she advised him to run as an independent candidate and to ask the popular Senator Teresa Hurst, from Pennsylvania to be his running mate instead, as winning Pennsylvania would increase his chances of ensuring neither major party candidate would achieve a majority in the Electoral College. On election night, Dalton won several key states, including Pennsylvania, guaranteeing that neither major-party candidate would secure a majority. Thanks to the efforts of Russell Jackson, Dalton was re-elected by the House of Representatives in a contingent election.

In season 4, McCord is considered to be a favorite to run for president, even over Vice President Hurst. Russell Jackson even tells her that President Dalton would prefer to leave the presidency to her, instead of Hurst, who has her own presidential ambitions. In the last episode of season 4, Elizabeth stated that she would indeed run for president.

In season 5, McCord offered her resignation to President Dalton, and he accepted. In the season 5 episode "Better Angels", Elizabeth was holding a public gathering at her family farm, during which she announced her candidacy for the presidency of the United States.

The first episode of season 6, "Hail to the Chief", reveals that McCord won her bid to become the nation's first female president. Flashbacks in the same episode show different key moments of McCord's campaign: her opponents were Republican Senator Beauregard Miller, a populist fearmonger who had picked up the nationalistic rhetoric started by disgraced Kentucky Senator Owen Callister, and a man named Hubbard. In the initial stretch of the campaign, McCord remained firmly in third position. Against the advice of her campaign manager Mike B, McCord decides to underscore her message of unity and opposition to entrenched partisanship by offering the vice presidency to her old rival, Senator Carlos Morejon. Although Morejon is reluctant at first to abandon the Republican Party, McCord promises him that she would not expect him to and promised to give him a chance to argue his own opinion on every policy she enacted, nor would she expect him to oppose the initiatives he opposed. At the end of the episode, McCord and Morejon appear together in a flashback at their first joint campaign rally. The sixth season also opens with accusations that the McCord campaign conspired with Iran to win the election. The second episode, "The Strike Zone", features former campaign manager turned Senior Counselor to the President Mike B. testifying in front of the Senate Intelligence Committee.  The following episodes portray two of McCord's staffers, Blake Moran and Daisy Grant, testifying to the Senate Intelligence Committee.  Later, Henry and Stephanie McCord are forced to testify.  In the semi-finale, President Elizabeth McCord testifies, against the counsel of multiple advisors. She is acquitted later in the episode.

Staff
With the exception of her personal assistant, Blake Moran (Erich Bergen), and new policy advisor Kat Sandoval (Sara Ramirez) Elizabeth inherited her entire senior staff from her predecessor, Vincent Marsh.

Her personal staff while Secretary of State consists of:
Nadine Tolliver (Bebe Neuwirth) – Chief of Staff to the Secretary (Ret. 2017)
Jay Whitman (Sebastian Arcelus) – Policy Advisor (closest equivalent: Under Secretary of State for Political Affairs) (2014–2017); Chief of Staff (2017–2019)
Mike B. (Kevin Rahm) – Acting White House Chief of Staff (2019-Present)
Daisy Grant (Patina Miller) – Spokesperson for the US Department of State (closest equivalent: Assistant Secretary of State for Public Affairs) (2014-2019); White House Press Secretary (2019-Present)
Matt Mahoney (Geoffrey Arend) – Head of Speechwriting
Blake Moran (Erich Bergen) – Executive assistant; Associate Policy Advisor (2017–Present)
Kat Sandoval (Sara Ramirez) – Policy advisor (2017–2019)

In "Blame Canada", she fired Allen Bollings (John Finn), the chief negotiator responsible for peace talks with Iran for threatening military action rather than the trade ban relaxations she authorized, and then lying to herself and to the president about it.

Starting in "Whisper of the Ax", Elizabeth recruited veteran political operative Michael "Mike B." Barnow (Kevin Rahm) as a special advisor to help her politically strategize; another politician once referred to Mike B. as her "personal hatchet man".

In "The Essentials", Nadine retires from the State Department upon learning that she's about to become a grandmother in order to spend time with her family in San Francisco.  After her departure, Elizabeth names Jay her new Chief of Staff.

Trivia
Elisabeth seems to be a rock music lover according to her nightwear, which often consists of a T-shirt with the print of a well-known (American) rock band or artist. Such as Red Hot Chili Peppers, Grateful Dead, Rainbow Kitten Surprise and Peter Frampton.

Reception
The character is likely to have been inspired by Hillary Clinton. She has been analyzed in the context of the media representation of female political figures.

See also
List of Madam Secretary characters

References

Fictional American diplomats
Fictional characters from Virginia
Television characters introduced in 2014
Fictional Central Intelligence Agency personnel
Fictional presidents of the United States
Fictional professors
Fictional United States Secretaries of State
Madam Secretary (TV series)